"From This Moment On" is a song by Canadian singer Shania Twain. It was released as the fourth single from her third studio album, Come On Over (1997). The song was written by Twain, with additional production and songwriting by Robert John "Mutt" Lange. Twain has performed "From This Moment On" on every one of her tours. Both a duet with backup singer Bryan White as well as a solo version were released.

"From This Moment On" is a country pop track that received generally favourable reviews from music critics, who deemed the song as one of the highlights on the album. The song achieved commercial success, reaching number two in Australia, number seven in New Zealand, number four in Canada and the United States, and number nine in the United Kingdom. The song also charted in France, Netherlands, and Sweden, as well on several US Billboard charts.

An accompanying music video, directed by Paul Boyd, depicts Twain walking down a hallway alone in a dress, and then toward the end of the video, she appears with a symphony orchestra to perform the remainder of the song.

Background and composition

"From This Moment On" was written during a soccer game in Italy. Shania Twain once explained, "We were in Italy at a soccer game. My husband loves sports. I don't know the game that well, so my mind drifted and I started writing." Initially, Twain thought that "From This Moment On" would be perfect for singer Celine Dion; however, as Twain and her husband at the time, Robert John "Mutt" Lange developed the song, they concluded that it would work best as a duet. While their first choice for the duet was Elton John, they chose country singer Bryan White. Twain later described White as "the best male voice in country music. Beyond country music! He's an excellent singer. So he needed to be on this record, because the song soars. It demands that. It demands dynamics." White explained that, by the time he went to the recording, the song was mostly finalized, and described it as 'extremely challenging' vocally. Twain also considered giving the song to fellow Canadian singer, Celine Dion, but Lange convinced her to keep it for herself.

Initial first-run pressings of the international version of the Come On Over album during March 1998 featured White on the song, while subsequent pressings began featuring the song as a solo recording. In early 1998, Mercury executives were informed that White would be unable to promote the song alongside Twain; therefore, Twain had to return to the studio to re-record White's parts on her own. According to White's spokesman at Asylum Records, "We've certainly heard knocking on our door about "From This Moment On" being too contemporary for Bryan's sake; therefore, it is fine if they want to go to the Top 40 without him." White later claimed that he had no hard feelings towards Twain for him being excluded from the international version of the song, stating, "They're releasing this song as a pop record, and I'm not a pop artist, so my feelings aren't hurt."

"From This Moment On" was released as the fourth single from Come On Over on May 4, 1998, in the United States while being released in Australia on August 10, 1998, and in the United Kingdom on November 16, 1998. Musically, "From This Moment On" is a country pop ballad set in common time with a free tempo. The song is written in the key of G major with Twain's vocal range spanning from the low note of D3 to the high note of C5. Nick Reynolds of BBC Music described the song as a power new country ballad with "a beautiful melody".

Reception

Music reviews
"From This Moment On" received generally favourable reviews from music critics. Pan-European magazine Music & Media wrote that Twain sounded "something like a cross between the Corrs and Celine Dion". Matt Bjorke of About.com deemed the song as one of the album's highlights, while Elizabeth Kessler of Yahoo! commented that "hardly any song can compare to this love anthem! ... Everyone feels their insides tug as they listen to this heart wrenching song." Country Universe writer Kevin John Coyne did separate reviews for "From This Moment On". While reviewing the duet, Coyne graded it a B and commented that it was mostly a showcase of White's vocals, "who turns in some signature licks and makes Twain seem a bit bland in comparison. However, it also gives the song a bit of a mid-eighties Peter Cetera vibe, which hasn't held up well over time." Coyne concluded, however, that the single release turned the track "into a potent solo number," and noted that "the addition of a Spanish-flavored guitar that borrowed heavily from 'Have You Ever Really Loved a Woman' gave the ballad added oomph." He graded the single release at an A−. At the 1999 Canadian Country Music Awards, "From This Moment On" won the award for Vocal/Instrumental Collaboration of the Year.

Chart performance
"From This Moment On" achieved considerable commercial success. In the United States, the song reached number four on the Billboard Hot 100, number one on the Adult Contemporary, and number six on the Hot Country Songs component chart. The song also peaked at number 16 on the Pop Songs chart and at number 22 Adult Pop Songs chart. On the chart compiled by Nielsen Soundscan, "From This Moment On" reached number four on the Canadian Singles Chart while going to number one on RPMs Country Songs and Adult Contemporary charts. In Australia, the track debuted at number 32, and climbed to a new peak of number two on its 11th week on the chart. The song stayed on the chart for a total of 32 weeks, and was the 10th best-selling single of 1998 in the country. "From This Moment On" peaked inside the Top 10 in New Zealand, where it reached number seven. The song failed to chart inside the top 10 of a few European countries, such as France, Netherlands, and Sweden. In the United Kingdom, the song debuted and peaked at number nine on the chart issue of November 18, 1998, and has sold more than 295,000 copies in the nation as of June 2019.

Music video and live performances
The song's accompanying music video was directed by Paul Boyd. It depicts Twain wearing a long dress and a bindi. She is walking down a hallway, attempting to go through several doors; however, they are all locked. Finally she finds an unlocked door, proceeds through it and finds an orchestra being led by a conductor. She stands in front and finishes singing the song. The video uses 'The Right Mix' of the song. This re-recorded solo version features slightly more contemporized instrumentation and removes White's vocals. The version shown on Twain's video compilations Come On Over: Video Collection (1999) and The Platinum Collection (2001) adds a short outtake during filming, in which Twain accidentally broke off a doorknob, to the end of the video.

Twain has performed "From This Moment On" on every one of her tours and on one occasion with the Backstreet Boys.

Track listings

 CD single
 "From This Moment On" (Pop Radio Mix) — 4:01
 "From This Moment On" (The I.V. Mix) — 5:00

 Part I – CD single
 "From This Moment On" (The Right Mix) — 4:01
 "You're Still the One" (Single Mix) — 3:18
 "You're Still the One" (Soul Solution Dance Radio Edit) — 4:03

 Part II – CD single
 "From This Moment On" (The Right Version) — 4:01
 "You're Still the One" (Soul Solution Dance Instrumental) — 8:41
 "Don't Be Stupid (You Know I Love You)" — 3:34

 Australian CD maxi
 "From This Moment On" (Solo/Vocal Remix) — 3:42
 "From This Moment On" (International Mix feat. Bryan White) - 4:44
 "You're Still the One" (Soul Solution Dance Radio Edit) — 4:03
 "You're Still the One" (Soul Solution Extended Club Mix) — 8:42
 "You're Still the One" (Doug Beck Pleasure Dub) — 6:09
 "You're Still the One" (Kano Dub) — 7:46

Credits and personnel
Credits are taken from the Come On Over album booklet.

Studio
 Recorded and mastered at Masterfonics (Nashville, Tennessee)

Personnel

 Shania Twain – writing, vocals, background vocals
 Robert John "Mutt" Lange – writing, background vocals, production
 Bryan White – guest vocals
 Biff Watson – guitars
 Dann Huff – guitars, guitar solo, guitar textures, six-string bass, talk box
 John Hughey – pedal steel guitar
 Joe Chemay – electric and fretless bass
 Michael Omartian – acoustic piano
 Arthur Stead – synthesizer
 Paul Leim – drums
 Carl Marsh – string arrangement and performance
 David Hamilton – string arrangement and performance
 Mike Shipley – mixing
 Olle Romo – programming, Pro Tools, sequencing, editing
 Glenn Meadows – mastering

Charts

Weekly charts

Year-end charts

Certifications

Release history

See also
 List of number-one country hits of 1998 (Canada)
 List of number-one adult contemporary singles of 1998 (U.S.)

References

Shania Twain songs
Bryan White songs
1990s ballads
1997 songs
1998 singles
Country ballads
Male–female vocal duets
Mercury Records singles
Music videos directed by Paul Boyd
Pop ballads
Song recordings produced by Robert John "Mutt" Lange
Songs written by Robert John "Mutt" Lange
Songs written by Shania Twain